The eighth edition of the Men's Football Tournament at the Pan American Games was held in San Juan, Puerto Rico, from July 2 to July 14, 1979. Nine teams competed in a first round-robin competition, with Brazil defending the title. After the preliminary round there was a second round, followed by a knock-out stage.

Games were played at Estadio Country Club, Estadio Sixto Escobar and Estadio Hiram Bithorn. Brazil won their third gold medal after beating Cuba in the final.

Preliminary round

Group A

Group B

Group C

Second round

Group A

Group B

Fifth-place match

Notes

Bronze medal match

Gold Medal match

Awards

Medalists

Goalscorers

References

Pan American Games
1979 Pan American Games
1979
Pan
Pan
1979